</noinclude>

Tux is a penguin character and the official brand character of the Linux kernel. Originally created as an entry to a Linux logo competition, Tux is the most commonly used icon for Linux, although different Linux distributions depict Tux in various styles. The character is used in many other Linux programs and as a general symbol of Linux.

History

Origins
The concept of the Linux brand character being a penguin came from Linus Torvalds, the creator of Linux. According to Jeff Ayers, Linus Torvalds had a "fixation for flightless, fat waterfowl" and Torvalds claims to have contracted "penguinitis" after being nibbled by a little penguin on a visit to the National Zoo & Aquarium, Canberra, Australia, joking that the disease "makes you stay awake at nights just thinking about penguins and feeling great love towards them".

Linus spoke at the 1994 AUUG Conference (5-9 Sept, Melbourne)  as part of a "World Tour" to Belgium, Australia, Singapore and elsewhere, mentioning in Linux Journal he was bitten by a penguin at Canberra Zoo, not at Phillip Island, Victoria, by a (shy) wild penguin.

In an interview Linus commented on the penguin bite:
 
At Canberra zoo a sign said in 2009 that staff believed the "original Tux" was still resident in the penguin enclosure.

Apart from this, in the book Just for Fun: The Story of an Accidental Revolutionary, there is an excerpt dedicated to how Tux became the mascot of the Linux OS. In the book, Linus says he doesn’t remember how Tux became the mascot, but believes the zoo story, which, according to his wife, Tove Torvalds, is probably right.

In 1996 after an initial design suggestion made by Alan Cox, use of an image Torvalds found on an FTP site, showing a penguin figurine depicted in a similar style to the Creature Comforts characters created by Nick Park, the concept for Tux was further refined by Torvalds on the Linux kernel mailing list. 

Torvalds was looking for something fun and sympathetic to associate with Linux, and he felt that a slightly fat penguin sitting down after having eaten a great meal perfectly fit the bill.

The final and original design was a submission for a Linux logo contest by Larry Ewing using the first publicly released version (0.54) of GIMP, a free software graphics package. It was released by him under the following condition:
 Since Tux won none of the three competitions that were held Tux is formally known as the Linux brand character and not the logo.

The first person to call the penguin "Tux" was James Hughes, who said that it stood for "(T)orvalds (U)ni(X)". However, tux is also an abbreviation of tuxedo, the outfit which bears resemblance in appearance to a penguin.

Tuz 2009

Tuz, a Tasmanian devil wearing a fake penguin beak, was the brand character of the 2009 linux.conf.au conference. It has been chosen by Linus Torvalds as the logo for version 2.6.29 of the Linux kernel to support the effort to save the Tasmanian devil species from extinction due to the devil facial tumour disease.

The image was designed by Andrew McGown and recreated as an SVG using Inkscape by Josh Bush, and released under the CC BY-SA license.

Linux for Workgroups 2013

For the Linux 3.11-rc1 release, Linus Torvalds changed the code name from "Unicycling Gorilla" to "Linux for Workgroups" and modified the logo that some systems display when booting to depict a Tux holding a flag with a symbol that is reminiscent of the logo of Windows for Workgroups 3.11, which was released in 1993.

Uses and reception
In some Linux distributions, for example Gentoo, Tux greets the user during booting with multi-processor systems displaying multiple images of Tux, one for each processor core.

Video games
Tux has taken on a role in the Linux community similar to that which Mario holds in the Nintendo community. The character has been featured in open-source look-alikes of other mainstream games, such as Tux Racer, Extreme Tux Racer, SuperTux, SuperTuxKart, and Tux Paint.

Female Tux versions in video games
Some games that star Tux also include explicitly female penguin characters, allowing the players to play as one of those characters instead of Tux. One such female penguin is Tux's friend "Gown". Gown is variously depicted as being a pink version of Tux (XTux) or as having a somewhat less fat appearance and wearing items of clothing such as a red and white short skirt and a hair bow (e.g. TuxKart and A Quest for Herring).

In SuperTux and SuperTuxKart, there is a different female penguin called "Penny" who is purple and white (SuperTuxKart once had Gown and still has a map called "Gown's Bow"). In the arcade game Tux 2 there is a female penguin called "Trixi", and in FreeCiv the female leader name for the Antarctican civilization is "Tuxette".

Tux in popular culture

 In a Froot Loops advertisement, Tux appears as a squeaky toy, the "secret weapon" to distract a pack of dogs pulling a sled containing the villain.
 In the comics Hellblazer, in issue 234 "Joyride, part 1", a Tux plush toy makes an appearance, set on the side of the road where a little girl was killed in a hit-and-run accident.
 Tux appeared as a character during one arc in the webcomic User Friendly.

Other uses
 In 1999, Corel Linux Deluxe included a free Linux Penguin (Tux) toy.
 Since around 2001, there was a Linux-based web server named TUX, which was deprecated around 2006.
 In 2006, Tux had an uncredited use in the Al Gore's Penguin Army video.
 In 2007, Tux was used by the German cutlery producer WMF in the Sealion set for children.
 In 2008, Tux has also been made as a virtual pet under the name Tux Droid by Kysoh for Linux and Windows, has many features including reading tweets from Twitter and checking the weather.
 Since 2009, TuxGuitar, a free guitar tab reading/editing program, features Tux holding a guitar as its brand character.
 In 2010, a prototype of a Tux monument with wings was presented in the Russian city of Tyumen by the local Linux user community.
 The avatar of Electronica artist Ephixa is based on Tux (around 2011).
 In April 2016, Tux was adapted to a designer toy called a Gwin and was distributed by October Toys. The toy was redesigned by different artists and sold in short collectible runs through the October Toys website and other collectable vinyl toy sites. October Toys has since ceased operations.

Gallery

See also

 List of computing mascots
 BSD Daemon, the mascot of various BSD releases
 Glenda, the Plan 9 Bunny, the mascot of Plan 9 from Bell Labs
 Kiki the Cyber Squirrel, the mascot of Krita
 Konqi, the mascot of KDE
 Mozilla (mascot), the mascot of Mozilla Foundation
 Puffy (mascot), the mascot of OpenBSD
 Tux Droid
 Wilber (mascot), the mascot of GIMP

References

External links

Linux
Bird mascots
Computing mascots
Fictional penguins
Free software culture and documents
Linus Torvalds
Linux kernel